Empress Zhaosheng or Empress Dowager Zhaosheng may refer to:

Empress Zhou (Former Shu) (died 918), Wang Jian's wife
Empress Li (Later Han) (died 954), Liu Chengyou's mother
Empress Zhaosheng (Jin dynasty) (1139–1163), mother of Emperor Xuanzong of Jin
Empress Dowager Ma (Southern Ming) (1578–1669), Zhu Youlang's mother
Empress Dowager Xiaozhuang (1613–1688), mother of the Shunzhi Emperor

See also
Empress Wenxian Zhaosheng (died before 1329), the mother of Jayaatu Khan (Emperor Wenzong of Yuan)
Empress Chiêu Thánh (昭聖皇后; died 1108), one of the consorts of Lý Nhân Tông